Donald Arthur Schollander (born April 30, 1946) is an American former competition swimmer, five-time Olympic champion, and former world record-holder in four events.  He won a total of five gold medals and one silver medal at the 1964 and 1968 Summer Olympics.  With four gold medals, he was the most successful athlete at the 1964 Olympics.

Early career
Schollander was born in Charlotte, North Carolina, and learned competitive swimming from his uncle, Newt Perry, who ran a swimming school in Florida. As a boy, Schollander moved with his family to Lake Oswego, Oregon. Although his first sporting passion was football, he was too small to compete in high school football. Instead, he joined Lake Oswego High School's swim team, and in 1960, helped lead the team to an Oregon state swimming championship as a freshman.

Olympics
As a teenager in 1962, Schollander moved to Santa Clara, California to train under swim coach George Haines of the Santa Clara Swim Club. Two years later at the age of 18, he won three freestyle events at the AAU national championships. He made the U.S. Olympic team in two individual events and two relays.  Months later, he won four gold medals and set three world records at the 1964 Summer Olympics, at the time the most medals won by an American since Jesse Owens in 1936. His success helped earn him the James E. Sullivan Award as the top amateur athlete in the United States, and the AP Athlete of the Year, defeating runner-up Johnny Unitas by a wide margin. He was also named ABC's Wide World of Sports Athlete of the Year.

Schollander appeared on an episode of To Tell the Truth immediately after winning his four gold medals.

College and Olympic swimming
Schollander attended Yale College and is a member of Skull and Bones, a secret society, and the Delta Kappa Epsilon (Phi chapter) fraternity. He was the captain of Yale's swim team, winning three individual NCAA championships. At the 1968 Summer Olympics, Schollander won another gold medal in the 4×200-meter freestyle relay, but finished second in the 200-meter freestyle, the event that Schollander had considered to be his best. This was the first Olympics in which 200-meter swimming events were part of the competition.

Following the 1968 Olympics, Schollander retired from competitive swimming.

After swimming
Schollander was inducted into the International Swimming Hall of Fame at age 19 in 1965. In 1983, he was one of the first group of inductees into the U.S. Olympic Hall of Fame. He is also a member of Oregon Sports Hall of Fame.

In 1971, he published his first book, Deep Water (with Duke Savage) chronicling his swimming, his teammates and coaches, and the behind-the-scenes politics of international swimming, especially the Olympic Games.  He followed this book in 1974 with Inside Swimming (with Joel H. Cohen).

Schollander and his wife  Cheryl reside in Lake Oswego, Oregon, where he runs Schollander Development, a real estate development company.  His gold medals are on display to the public at a Bank of America branch location in downtown Lake Oswego. Schollander has three children, Jeb, Kyle and Katie.

See also

 List of multiple Olympic gold medalists
 List of multiple Olympic gold medalists at a single Games
 List of Olympic medalists in swimming (men)
 List of Yale University people
 World record progression 200 metres freestyle
 World record progression 400 metres freestyle
 World record progression 4 × 100 metres freestyle relay
 World record progression 4 × 200 metres freestyle relay

References

Bibliography
Schollander, Don, and Duke Savage, Deep Water, Pelham Books (1971).  .
Schollander, Don, and Joel H. Cohen, Inside Swimming, Contemporary Books (1974).  .

External links

 
 
 
 

1946 births
Living people
American people of German descent
American male freestyle swimmers
World record setters in swimming
James E. Sullivan Award recipients
Lake Oswego High School alumni
Olympic gold medalists for the United States in swimming
Sportspeople from Charlotte, North Carolina
Sportspeople from Lake Oswego, Oregon
Swimmers at the 1963 Pan American Games
Swimmers at the 1964 Summer Olympics
Swimmers at the 1967 Pan American Games
Swimmers at the 1968 Summer Olympics
Yale Bulldogs men's swimmers
Medalists at the 1968 Summer Olympics
Medalists at the 1964 Summer Olympics
Pan American Games gold medalists for the United States
Pan American Games silver medalists for the United States
Swimmers from Oregon
Pan American Games medalists in swimming
Yale College alumni
Yale University alumni
Medalists at the 1963 Pan American Games
Medalists at the 1967 Pan American Games